Roberto Rodríguez (August 14, 1936 – July 3, 2021) was an Argentine Roman Catholic prelate. He served as the titular bishop of Pertusa from 1992 to 1998 and the fourth Bishop of the Roman Catholic Diocese of Villa María in Argentina from 1998 to 2006. He was then appointed the sixth Bishop of the Roman Catholic Diocese of La Rioja by Pope John Paul II, a position he held from 2006 until his retirement on July 9, 2013. 

Rodríguez was born in Temperley district, Greater Buenos Aires, on August 14, 1936. He was ordained as a Catholic priest on January 31, 1970, in the town of Cosquín, by the Archbishop of Córdoba Raúl Francisco Primatesta. He later completed a theology degree at Pontifical Gregorian University.

Roberto Rodríguez, the Bishop Emeritus of La Rioja, died from COVID-19 at a hospital in Jesús María, Córdoba Province, on July 3, 2021, at the age of 85.

References

1936 births
2021 deaths
Argentine Roman Catholic bishops
20th-century Roman Catholic titular bishops
Pontifical Gregorian University alumni
People from Villa María
People from Córdoba Province, Argentina
People from La Rioja Province, Argentina
Deaths from the COVID-19 pandemic in Argentina
Roman Catholic bishops of Villa Maria
Roman Catholic bishops of La Rioja